Bejan Matur (born 14 September 1968, Kahramanmaraş) is a Kurdish poet and writer from Turkey.

Background
Matur was born to an Alevi Kurdish family on 14 September 1968 in the city of Kahramanmaraş in Turkey's Mediterranean Region. Her first school education was in her village; later she attended the long-established Lycée in the region's most important cultural center Gaziantep. These years were spent living with her sisters far from their parents. She studied Law at Ankara University, but has never practiced. In her university years, she was published in several literary periodicals. Reviewers found her poetry "dark and mystic". The shamanist poetry with its pagan perceptions, belonging to the past rather than the present, of her birthplace and the nature and life of her village, attracted much attention.

Books
Her first book, Rüzgar Dolu Konaklar (Winds Howl Through the Mansions), published in 1996, unrelated to the contemporary mainstream of Turkish poets and poetry, won several literary prizes. Her second book, Tanrı Görmesin Harflerimi (God Must Not See The Letter of My Script) in 1999 was warmly greeted. Two further books, appeared at the same time in 2002, Ayın Büyüttüğü Oğullar (The Sons Reared by the Moon) and Onun Çölünde (In His Desert), have been continuing the distinctive language and world of imagery special to herself and her poetry.

Her poem has been translated up to 17 languages. She has a translated book, which published by ARC in England, called in the Temple of a Patient God.

Her translated book in German and French published in Luxembourg by PHİ Publishing House.
Her last book, İbrahim’in Beni Terketmesi (Leaving of Abraham), published in March 2008, was considered by the critics to be her best book ever. In that book, her new way of imagery was considered as mystique. She created a personal ontology and a personal mythology inspired by the thousands year of Sufi Tradition.

May 2009, she has published an album-book called Doğunun Kapısı: Diyarbakır (The Gate of East: Diyarbakir). The book is about the city called Diyarbakir, which is ancestral homeland of Kurdish and Armenian people. She has written a history of the city, which is nearly 3000 years old. Through her poetic text and the photos you can see the history of the city form ancient time to present. The book is considered by the critics, as one of the best book ever written about an Anatolian city.

In 2010, she published Kader Denizi (Sea of Fate) with the photographs taken by Mehmet Günyeli after the exhibition of Sea of Fate in the prestigious galleries in Istanbul and Ankara.

In 2010, she contributed to Son Defa with a monologue about love, played by Tiyatro Oyunevi and to Özgürlük (Freedom) with a poem called Dağ (Mountain), published with the cooperation of Amnesty International.

In February 2011 she published her recent book called Dağın Ardına Bakmak (Looking Behind the Mountain) which is her first prose book. It is about the PKK Guerillas. For the book, she went to steep Kandil Mountain, where PKK is located and hided, for making interviews with the guerrillas, fight against the Turkish Army. The book is the first attempt to show off the personal stories and traumas of the guerillas behind the frontiers in the war.

Journalism
Since 2005, she writes regular articles for the Op-Ed of daily newspaper called Zaman as a columnist. She sometimes appeared in an English circulated newspaper Today's Zaman. Mainly, she writes about Kurdish politics, Armenian issue, daily politics, minority problems, prison literature, and women issues. She also runs of a cultural foundation called DKSV (Diyarbakır Cultural Art Foundation) which is located in Diyarbakır. She is conducting social projects with children, women and the younger population who were removed from their village.

She is making a TV programme which called ATLAS is about culture, art and politics.
Bejan Matur, who believes there is no frontier between poetry and life, travels the world like a long-term desert nomad. She stops by Istanbul, a city she sometimes lives in.

Books
Rüzgâr Dolu Konaklar (Winds Howl Through the Mansions),1996, poetry
Onun Çölünde (In His Desert), 2002, poetry
Ayın Büyüttüğü Oğullar (Sons Reared by the Moon), 2002, poetry
İbrahim’in Beni Terk Etmesi (Leaving of Abraham), 2008, poetry
In the Temple of a Patient God, 2003, Poetry-A Collection of her translated works
Doğunun Kapısı: Diyarbakır (The Gate of East: Diyarbakir), 2009, Poetry
Kader Denizi (Sea of Fate), 2010, Poetry
Dağın Ardına Bakmak (Looking Behind the Mountain), 2011
''Son Dag, 2014

References

External links
Transcript-review.org , Bejan Matur's Poems 
Şiir.gen.tr, Bejan Matur's Poems 
As a columnist her articles in Zaman Newspaper 
Today's Zaman 
Matur's Books

People from Kahramanmaraş
Turkish-language poets
Turkish Kurdish people
Living people
Ankara University Faculty of Law alumni
1968 births
Kurdish Alevis
Zaman (newspaper) people